Samingad  (Puyuma: Samingad Purepurepuan ; ; zhuyin:ㄐㄧˋ ㄒㄧㄠˇㄐㄩㄣ; born 2 October 1977) is an aboriginal Taiwanese pop singer and songwriter. She is an ethnic Puyuma, whose name means "unique". She was born in Taitung County, to a father of Bunun descent and a mother of Puyuma descent. Her uncle is Purdur, the winner of the Best Mandarin Male Singer of the 11th Golden Melody Awards. Her younger sister, Jia Jia, is also a singer.

Samingad was discovered while singing in a restaurant, where she worked as a waitress. Her first album "Voice of Puyuma" was released with Magic Stone Records and received a Golden Melody Award for "Best New Artist" 1999. In 2001 she received a Golden Melody Award for "Best Dialect (Non-Mandarin Language) Female Vocalist" for her second album "Wild Fire, Spring Wind". Her music draws much of its inspiration from the Christian Gospels, as well as from tales of the tribe's former agricultural and hunting lifestyle, and from the complex emotions triggered by Puyuma's struggles in Taiwan's contemporary society.

References

1977 births
Taiwanese Hokkien pop singers
People from Taitung County
Living people
Puyuma people
Bunun people
21st-century Taiwanese singers
21st-century Taiwanese women singers